Dean Sullivan (born 7 June 1955) is an English actor and director, best known for playing Jimmy Corkhill in the Channel 4 soap opera Brookside between 1986 and 2003.

Early life
Sullivan was born in Liverpool on 7 June 1955. He graduated from Lancaster University with a B.Ed. (Hons) and was a primary school teacher for six years before becoming an actor. He continued to work as a substitute teacher between roles before Brookside became his full-time job.

Career
Sullivan was a member of Liverpool's Epstein Theatre (at that time named the Neptune Theatre) and appeared in the Willy Russell play Breezeblock Park and the Phil Redmond play Soaplights at the Liverpool Playhouse. He joined Brookside in February 1986 and remained with the programme until it ended in November 2003, featuring in many of its most popular storylines during that time. In 1994, he offered to resign from the series when reading in his scripts that his character was to take ecstasy; he reportedly urged producers to kill his character off in an attempt to warn youngsters about the dangers of taking drugs, but his offer was rejected.

Sullivan has organised "murder weekends" with his company, The Murder Game. In 2001, he appeared on Lily Savage's Blankety Blank. In 2008, he appeared in the sitcom Terry Across the Mersey, and presented a daily show on City Talk 105.9 from the Radio City Tower until May 2009. However, after Ofcom ruled that City Talk would also be allowed to play music, he was dropped from the schedule. Recently, he took part in a protest against violence in Liverpool as part of a march organised by charity Term Time.

Sullivan was keen to buy Brookside Close, the purpose-built street which was created for the series and was later sold in December 2008, as he wanted to revive the show. However, the houses were sold to a different buyer. In August 2011, he expressed interest in reprising his role as Jimmy Corkhill in other soap operas.

References

External links

English male soap opera actors
1955 births
Living people
Male actors from Liverpool
English gay actors
21st-century English LGBT people